Lucie Chroustovská (born 13 January 1972) is a Czech cross-country skier. She competed in three events at the 1994 Winter Olympics.  Chroustovská participated in the women's 15 kilometre freestyle, the 30 kilometre freestyle and the 4 x 5 kilometre relay.  She finished 48th in the 15 km event, 39th in the 30 km event, and helped the Czech Republic to a 9th-place finish in the relay. She was the first woman to represent the Czech Republic at the Olympics.

Cross-country skiing results
All results are sourced from the International Ski Federation (FIS).

Olympic Games

World Championships

World Cup

Season standings

References

External links
 

1972 births
Living people
Czech female cross-country skiers
Olympic cross-country skiers of the Czech Republic
Cross-country skiers at the 1994 Winter Olympics
Sportspeople from Liberec